Nazareno Damián Solís (born 22 April 1994) is an Argentine professional footballer who plays as a left winger for Alvarado, on loan from Boca Juniors.

References

External links
 

1994 births
Living people
People from Campana, Buenos Aires
Argentine footballers
Association football forwards
Argentine expatriate footballers
Argentine expatriate sportspeople in Chile
Expatriate footballers in Chile
Expatriate footballers in Greece
Primera B Metropolitana players
Primera Nacional players
Chilean Primera División players
Argentine Primera División players
Villa Dálmine footballers
Universidad de Chile footballers
Talleres de Córdoba footballers
Boca Juniors footballers
Club Atlético Huracán footballers
San Martín de San Juan footballers
Aldosivi footballers
OFI Crete F.C. players
Club Atlético Alvarado players
Sportspeople from Buenos Aires Province